Miklós Szabó (22 December 1928 – 29 June 2022) was a Hungarian long-distance runner. He competed in the 5000 metres at the 1956 Summer Olympics and the 1960 Summer Olympics.

References

External links
 

1928 births
2022 deaths
Athletes (track and field) at the 1956 Summer Olympics
Athletes (track and field) at the 1960 Summer Olympics
Hungarian male long-distance runners
Olympic athletes of Hungary
People from Kecskemét
20th-century Hungarian people